Live in San Diego is a DVD of a concert by the band Switchfoot. It was released in 2004, between the band's albums The Beautiful Letdown and Nothing Is Sound.  With the exception of "Learning to Breathe", all of the songs performed at this concert were from their 2003 double-platinum selling album The Beautiful Letdown. The concert was played at SOMA, in San Diego, California. The DVD was certified platinum by the RIAA selling over 100,000 copies.

Song listing
This Is Your Life
Ammunition
Gone
Learning to Breathe
More Than Fine
Adding to the Noise
Twenty Four
On Fire
The Beautiful Letdown
Meant to Live
Dare You to Move

DVD Video Extras
Interviews
"Meant to Live" Video
"Making of the "Meant to Live" Video
Photo Gallery

Awards

On 2005, the album won a Dove Award for Long Form Music Video of the Year at the 36th GMA Dove Awards.

References

Concert films
Christian live video albums
Switchfoot